Christopher Sower (27 January 1754 in Germantown, Pennsylvania – 3 July 1799 in Baltimore, Maryland) was a printer and publisher in Pennsylvania.

Biography
He was the son of Christopher Sower the younger and the grandson of Christopher Sower the elder. He developed a strong distaste for those who criticized the German sectarians and their beliefs.  These critics included Benjamin Franklin, Henry Melchior Muhlenberg and John Henry Miller.  With his preferences, Sower was naturally of loyalist sympathies before and during the Revolutionary War.

He received his father's Germantown home and printing and publishing operations in 1774 when they were handed over to him without legal formality. He then began publishing a newspaper, Germantowner Zeitung, which had a loyalist tone so far as the authorities allowed. When the British occupied Philadelphia in 1777, he moved there.  During this time he was wounded and captured by rebel troops; he was released by exchange a short time later. He accompanied the British to New York City in 1778 when they abandoned Philadelphia.  That year the family belongings were confiscated and sold by the rebels.

After Cornwallis's defeat in 1781, Sower went to England and received an indemnification for his losses.  In 1785 he went to New Brunswick where he was deputy postmaster and king's printer.  He died in the Baltimore house of his brother.

See also
German American journalism

Notes

Notes

References
 
 
 

1754 births
1799 deaths
American printers
American publishers (people)
Loyalists in the American Revolution from Pennsylvania
German-language mass media in the United States
Colonial American printers